Enrico Deaglio (born 11 April 1947) is an Italian journalist, writer and TV presenter.

Biography
Deaglio was born in Turin, where he graduated in medicine (June 1971) and worked in the Mauriziano Hospital.

In the mid-1970s, he started his journalist career for the communist newspaper Lotta continua, of which he was editor from 1977 to 1982. Later he worked for numerous national newspapers and magazine, including La Stampa, Il Manifesto, Panorama, Epoca and l'Unità. From 1985 to 1986 he was the editor of the newspaper Reporter.

From the later 1980s he worked for the news show Mixer on RAI TV, focusing in particular on the Sicilian mafia and events Abroad. From 1997 to 2008 he was editor of the weekly Diario.

In 2006 his TV documentary Uccidete la democrazia! (Kill Democracy!), where he suggested that electronic votes in the 2006 Italian general elections were manipulated in favour of Silvio Berlusconi's party, House of Freedoms, generated significant controversies. Deaglio's theory was subsequently discarded by an official recount of ballots by the Italian Parliament.

His brother, Mario Deaglio, is an economist at the University of Turin.

Selected bibliography
 (1989)
 (1991)
 (1992)
 (1992)
 (1995)
 (1996)
 (1998)
 (2009)
 (2015)
 (2018)

References

1947 births
Living people
Journalists from Turin
Italian television journalists
Italian male non-fiction writers
Italian newspaper editors
Italian magazine editors
Mass media people from Turin
Italian magazine founders